Eskew is a surname. Notable people with the surname include:

Jack Eskew (1940–2016), American arranger and orchestrator 
Michael L. Eskew (born 1949), American businessman
Tucker Eskew, American political and communications strategist